The 2015–16 Wisconsin Badgers women's basketball team represented the University of Wisconsin–Madison during the 2015–16 NCAA Division I women's basketball season. The Badgers, led by fifth year head coach Bobbie Kelsey, play their home games at the Kohl Center and are members of the Big Ten Conference. They finished the season 7–22, 3–15 in Big Ten play to finish in fourteenth place. They lost in the first round of the Big Ten women's tournament to Northwestern.

On March 4, Bobby Kelsey was fired. She finished a six year record at Wisconsin of 47–100.

Roster

Schedule

|-
!colspan=9 style=""| Exhibition

|-
!colspan=9 style=""| Non-conference regular season

|-
!colspan=9 style=""| Big Ten regular season

|-
!colspan=9 style="text-align: center; "|Big Ten Conference Women's Tournament

Source

See also
2015–16 Wisconsin Badgers men's basketball team

References

Wisconsin Badgers women's basketball seasons
Wisconsin
Wiscon
Wiscon